Prestonfield is a primarily residential suburb in the south of Edinburgh, the capital of Scotland. It lies to the east of the A7 road, as it leaves the city centre, approximately 3 miles south of the centre. It is best known as being home to Prestonfield House, a renowned hotel, and Prestonfield Golf Club. The golf course is the nearest to the city centre.

It lies west of Duddingston and is bounded on  its west side by Newington Cemetery. Cameron Toll lies to the south. Pollock Halls of Residence and the Commonwealth Pool lie to the north.

The area was known as Priestfield until the late seventeenth century, a name retained by some institutions and street names and revived by the parish church in 1975..

The area is visually dominated by Arthur's Seat and Salisbury Crags to the east, which tower above the area.

Notable Buildings

Prestonfield House - Now a hotel
Cameron House (1770) for the Dicks of Prestonfield
Priestfield Parish Church (1880)

References

External links
 Google Maps
 Prestonfield's local parish church
Prestonfield Primary School

Areas of Edinburgh